Dunluce Castle is a now-ruined medieval castle in Northern Ireland, the seat of Clan MacDonnell. It is located on the edge of a basalt outcropping in County Antrim (between Portballintrae and Portrush), and is accessible via a bridge connecting it to the mainland. The castle is surrounded by extremely steep drops on either side, which may have been an important factor to the early Christians and Vikings who were drawn to this place where an early Irish fort once stood.

History
In the 13th century, Richard Óg de Burgh, 2nd Earl of Ulster, built the first castle at Dunluce. It was first documented to be in the hands of the McQuillan family in 1513. The McQuillans were the Lords of Route from the late 13th century until they were displaced by the MacDonnell after losing two major battles against them during the mid- and late-16th century.

Later Dunluce Castle became the home of the chief of the Clan MacDonnell of Antrim and the Clan MacDonald of Dunnyveg from Scotland. Chief John Mor MacDonald was the second son of Good John of Islay, Lord of the Isles, 6th chief of Clan Donald in Scotland. John Mor MacDonald l was born through John of Islay's second marriage to Princess Margaret Stewart, daughter of King Robert II of Scotland. In 1584, on the death of James MacDonald the 6th chief of the Clan MacDonald of Antrim and Dunnyveg, the Antrim Glens were seized by Sorley Boy MacDonnell, one of his younger brothers. Sorley Boy took the castle, keeping it for himself and improving it in the Scottish style. Sorley Boy swore allegiance to Queen Elizabeth I and his son Randal was made 1st Earl of Antrim by King James I.

Four years later, the Girona, a galleass from the Spanish Armada, was wrecked in a storm on the rocks nearby. The cannons from the ship were installed in the gatehouses and the rest of the cargo sold, the funds being used to restore the castle. MacDonnell's granddaughter Rose was born in the castle in 1613.

A local legend states that at one point, part of the kitchen next to the cliff face collapsed into the sea, after which the wife of the owner refused to live in the castle any longer. According to a legend, when the kitchen fell into the sea, only a kitchen boy survived, as he was sitting in the corner of the kitchen which did not collapse. However, the kitchen is still intact and next to the manor house. You can still see the oven, fireplace and entry ways into it. It wasn't until some time in the 18th century that the north wall of the residence building collapsed into the sea. The east, west and south walls still stand.

Dunluce Castle served as the seat of the Earl of Antrim until the impoverishment of the MacDonnells in 1690, following the Battle of the Boyne. Since that time, the castle has deteriorated and parts were scavenged to serve as materials for nearby buildings.

Dunluce town
In 2011, major archaeological excavations found significant remains of the "lost town of Dunluce", which was razed to the ground in the Irish uprising of 1641.

Lying adjacent to Dunluce Castle, the town was built around 1608 by Randall MacDonnell, the first Earl of Antrim, and pre-dates the official Plantation of Ulster. It may have contained the most revolutionary housing in Europe when it was built in the early 17th century, including indoor toilets which had only started to be introduced around Europe at the time, and a complex street network based on a grid system. 95% of the town is still to be discovered.

Preservation
Dunluce Castle is in the care of the Northern Ireland Environment Agency.  It is a monument in state care sited in the townland of Dunluce, in Coleraine Borough Council area, at grid ref: C9048 4137. The earthworks, adjacent to Dunluce Castle, are a scheduled historic monument, at grid ref: area of C905 412.

Cultural references
 The castle inspired the orchestral tone poem Dunluce (1921) by Irish composer Norman Hay.
 Dunluce Castle is thought to be the inspiration for Cair Paravel in C. S. Lewis's Chronicles of Narnia (1950–54).
 Ron Moody menaced Jack Wild and Helen Raye at Dunluce Castle in Flight of the Doves, a 1971 film.
 In 1973 the castle appeared on the inner gatefold of the multi-million selling Led Zeppelin album Houses of the Holy.
 On the 1984 Gary Moore video "Emerald Aisles" on his return to Northern Ireland, he visits the castle and talks about the history of the castle. Cassette and CD versions of Gary Moore's 1989 album After the War feature an instrumental track titled "Dunluce" in one and two parts respectively.
 The castle is also the subject of a 1990s song named "Dunluce Castle" written by George Millar and sung by the Irish Rovers.
 The castle is mentioned and appears briefly in Michael Palin's 1994 episode of Great Railway Journeys, Derry to Kerry.
 The castle appeared as Snakehead's hideout under the name 'Ravens Keep' in the 2003 movie, The Medallion, which starred Jackie Chan.
 It is also featured on the cover of the album Glasgow Friday (2008) by American musician Jandek.

See also
 List of castles in Northern Ireland

References
Specific references:

General references:

 Culture Northern ireland

Further reading

External links

 from the Northern Ireland Tourist Board Discover Northern Ireland website.

Castles in County Antrim
Former populated places in Northern Ireland
Northern Ireland Environment Agency properties
Ruined castles in Northern Ireland
Scheduled monuments in Northern Ireland
Tourist attractions in County Antrim